The Samuel Colby House is a historic house located at 74 Winthrop Street in Taunton, Massachusetts.  Built in 1869 for a prominent local businessman, it is one of the city's best examples of high-style Italianate architecture.  It was listed on the National Register of Historic Places in 1984.

Description and history
The Samuel Colby House is located south of downtown Taunton, on the south side of Winthrop Street at its junction with Walnut Street.  It is a two-story wood-frame structure, with a stuccoed finish, and a low-pitch hip roof capped by a large square cupola.  The main roof has elongated eaves studded with paired brackets, and the cupola roof has a curtain-style valance.  The house is three bays wide, with a polygonal bay above the main entrance at the center of the front facade.  The bays are demarcated by pilasters, and a single-story porch extends across the width of the front.  The porch has a flat roof with bracketed eave, and is extensively decorated with stickwork.  A similar porch extends along the side of the rear ell, facing Walnut Street.

The house was built in 1869 for Samuel Colby, a manufacturer and retailer of men's and boy's clothing who operated a store in the Union Block in downtown Taunton.  It is one of the city's least-altered post-Civil War 19th-century houses, and a particularly distinctive example of high-style Italianate architecture.

See also
National Register of Historic Places listings in Taunton, Massachusetts
List of historic houses in Massachusetts

References

National Register of Historic Places in Taunton, Massachusetts
Houses in Taunton, Massachusetts
Houses on the National Register of Historic Places in Bristol County, Massachusetts